Maurizio Randazzo (born 1 March 1964) is an Italian fencer. He won a gold medal in the team épée events at the 1996 and 2000 Summer Olympics.

References

External links
 

1964 births
Living people
Italian male fencers
Olympic fencers of Italy
Fencers at the 1992 Summer Olympics
Fencers at the 1996 Summer Olympics
Fencers at the 2000 Summer Olympics
Olympic gold medalists for Italy
Olympic medalists in fencing
People from Caltanissetta
Medalists at the 1996 Summer Olympics
Medalists at the 2000 Summer Olympics
Universiade medalists in fencing
Universiade silver medalists for Italy
Medalists at the 1989 Summer Universiade
Medalists at the 1991 Summer Universiade
Medalists at the 1993 Summer Universiade
Sportspeople from the Province of Caltanissetta